Nawamin Road is a highway in Bangkok, Thailand. It begins at Seri Thai Road and continues north as far as its end at Raminthra Road (Route 304). Its total length is approximately 20 km.

Important roads that intersect with Nawamin Road include Si Burapha Road, Pho Kaeo Road, Prasoet Manukit Road (Route 351), as well as the newly completed Ratchada–Ram Inthra Road (Route 350) and the nearly completed expressway that runs parallel above it.

References

Nawamin